Joseph Rue was a French vice-admiral during World War II. He led a fleet of 10 warships in the shelling of Royan in April 1945.

Notes

French Navy admirals
French military personnel of World War II